The Dandenong Southern Stingrays are an Australian rules football team in the NAB League, the Victorian statewide under-18s competition.

1992 saw the birth of the Southern Stingrays, developed under the leadership of Steve Kennedy (Regional Manager) and Ron Roach (Promotions Manager) with its home base located at Ben Kavanagh Reserve, Mordialloc. The side is coached in the inaugural year by Peter Russo.

In 1995 the club moved from Mordialloc to Dandenong and it also changed its name to the Dandenong Southern Stingrays. The club is currently under the leadership of Darren Flanigan (Region Talent Manager) and Matthew Crozier (Female Talent Coordinator) with the home base located at Shepley Oval, Dandenong. The side is coached by Nick Cox.

Results

Premiers (1) 
 2018

Runner Ups (6) 
 1997, 2005, 2008, 2009, 2013, 2022

Minor Premiers (4) 
 1997, 2010, 2016, 2018

Wooden Spoons (0) 
 Nil

Yearly Ladder Placings

Grand Finals
The Stingrays have made the Grand final on six occasions and have won one premiership.

1997: North Ballarat Rebels - 16.15 (111) d. Dandenong Stingrays - 10.16 (76)
2005: Gippsland Power - 12.9 (81) d. Dandenong Stingrays - 10.6 (66)
2008: Murray Bushrangers - 21.16 (142) d. Dandenong Stingrays - 9.7 (61)
2009: Calder Cannons 17.10 (112) d. Dandenong Stingrays - 14.14 (98)
2013: Eastern Ranges - 24.8 (152) d. Dandenong Stingrays - 5.10 (40)
2018: Dandenong Stingrays - 12.8 (80) d. Oakleigh Chargers - 11.8 (74)

Players drafted to the AFL

1992: Darren King, Danny Winkel, Kane Batzloff, Justin Leppitsch
1993: Christian O'Brien, Michael Prentice, Shayne Smith, Clint Shaw
1994: Jeff White, Matthew Joy, Chad Liddell, Michael Agnello, Austinn Jones
1995: Chad Morrison, Ashley Gehling, Daniel Marshall, Ryan Aitken
1996: Paul Corrigan, Tom Gilligan, Mark Winterton, Chris Holcombe
1997: Travis Johnstone, Trent Croad, Kris Massie, Andrew Williams, Craig Black, Darren Hulme
1998: Adam Ramanauskas, Brendan Fevola, Toby Thurstans, Craig Jacotine, Steven Rode
1999: David Hille, Daniel Wulf
2000: Laurence Angwin, Ryan Lonie, Michael Handby, Adam McPhee, Chris Newman, Nathan Lonie, Stephen Milne
2001: -
2002: Steven Salopek, Paul Johnson, Matthew Boyd
2003: Shane Tuck, Aaron Edwards
2004: Jarred Moore, Damien McCormack, Jayden Attard, Luke Forsyth, Anthony Raso, Zane Leonard
2005: Nathan Jones, Ryan Cook, Travis Tuck
2006: Andrejs Everitt, Greg Bentley, Daniel Nicholls
2007: Jarrad Grant, Scott Simpson, Jarrad Boumann
2008: Tom Gillies, Ash Smith, Shane Savage, Steven Gaertner.
2009: Tom Scully, Ryan Bastinac, Dylan Roberton, Rohan Kerr, Levi Casboult
2010: Thomas Lynch, Jake Batchelor, Mitchell Hallahan, Luke Parker, Andrew McInnes, Arryn Siposs, Tom Curren,
2011: Matthew Buntine, Nick Haynes, Todd Elton, Jordan Kelly, Brett O'Hanlon, Darren Minchington, Piva Wright
2012: Lachie Whitfield, Taylor Garner, Nathan Wright, Lewis Pierce, Tim McGenniss
2013: Zak Jones, Billy Hartung, James Harmes
2014: Tom Lamb, Jack Lonie, Bailey Dale, Mitch White
2015: Jacob Weitering, Kieran Collins, Brandon White, Liam Hulett, Bailey Rice, Kurt Mutimer, Gach Nyuon
2016: Josh Battle, Myles Poholke, Mitch McCarthy
2017: Luke Davies-Uniacke, Hunter Clark, Aiden Bonar, Tom De Koning, Oscar Clavarino, Tom Murphy
2018: Sam Sturt, William Hamill, Bailey Williams, Zac Foot, Toby Bedford, Lachie Young, Sam Fletcher, Matthew Cottrell, Mitchell Riordan, Jordyn Allen, Shelley Heath
2019: Hayden Young, Sam De Koning, Ned Cahill, Cody Weightman, Bigoa Nyuon, Molly McDonald, Isabella Shannon, Brooke Vernon, Courtney Jones
2020: Deakyn Smith

Captain(s)

2016 Luke Dalmau (C),

2013 Nathan Foote (C),

2012

2011

2010 Luke Parker, Mitch Hallahan

2009 Ryan Bastinac, Tom Scully

2008  Ricky Ferraro, Paul Rogasch

2007  Russell Gabriel

2006  Matt Robinson, Mitch Bosward

2005 Greg Bentley

2004 Jarred Moore

2003 Kane Taylor

2002 Michael Stinear

2001 Andrew Tuck

2000 Ricky Clark

1999 Michael Ablett

1998 Craig Jacotine, Chris Fortnam

1997 Ben Lovett, Craig Black

1996 Anthony Hardie, Daniel Anderson

1995 Michael Agnello

1994 Brad Lloyd

1993 Ben Delarue

1992 Darren King

Best and Fairest

2016Thomas Glen/Myles Poholke

2015 Daniel Capiron

2014 Mirchell White

2013 Nathan Foote

2012 Tim McGenness

2011 Nick Haines

2010 Jake Batchelor

2009 Luke Parker

2008 Tom Gillies

2007 Matthew Clark

2006 Curtis Barker

2005 Greg Bentley

2004 Jarred Moore

2003 Marc Holt

2002 Michael Stinear

2001 Andrew Tuck

2000 Chris Newman

1999 Michael Burke

1998 Ashley Roberts

1997 Trent Croad

1996 Ben Lovett

1995 George Harrack

1994 Austinn Jones

1993 Shayne Smith

1992 Justin Leppitsch

Coaches
 Craig Black (2014–present)
 Graeme Yeats (2004–2013)
 Rob Dean (1996–2003)
 Greg Hutchison (1993–1995)
 Peter Russo (1992)

External links

Official Dandenong Stingrays website
Star News Group.com

NAB League clubs
1991 establishments in Australia

Australian rules football clubs in Melbourne
Dandenong, Victoria
NAB League Girls clubs
Sport in the City of Greater Dandenong
Australian rules football clubs established in 1991